Abed Mahfouz (born 1956) is a Lebanese fashion designer.

Career 

Raised in a modest family in Lebanon and being surrounded with family members that work in tailoring, Mahfouz opened his first bridal boutique in 1985 with his sister in Beirut, Lebanon.

After the success of what was known as a tailoring workshop, Mahfouz started designing and drawing semi-complete couture collections in April 1990.

June 1999 was the launch of the designer's first fashion show in which he showcased a complete collection of wedding gowns at the Royal Plaza Hotel.

The official launch of the Abed Mahfouz Bridal line "Dreamer" was during the Spring/Summer fashion season in June 2001. The line was launched through a fashion show at the Phoenicia Intercontinental.

The brand's major turning point was the official launch of the Abed Mahfouz Couture line during Alta Roma Fashion Week in Rome, Italy October 2002.

In February 2010 he debuted his first ready-to-wear collection during New York Fashion Week.

References

External links 

 
 
 
 
 
 Daria Strokous
 

Living people
Lebanese fashion designers
1956 births